Class 30 may refer to:
 The original designation of the British Rail Class 31 diesel-electric locomotive
 EAR 30 class, East African 2-8-4 steam locomotive
 New South Wales C30 class locomotive, Australian 4-6-4T steam locomotive
 L&YR Class 30 (disambiguation), various steam locomotives
 NSB Class 30, Norwegian 4-6-0 steam locomotive